Yitzhak-Meir Levin, (30 January 1893 – 7 August 1971) was a Haredi politician in Poland and Israel. One of 37 people to sign the Israeli declaration of independence, he served in several Israeli cabinets, and was a longtime leader and Knesset minister for Agudat Yisrael and related parties.

Biography
Yitzhak Meir Levin was born as Izaak Meir Lewin in Góra Kalwaria (known as Ger in Yiddish) in the Congress Poland part of the Russian Empire. He was a paternal descendant of Chanokh Heynekh Levin (1789-1870). In his early years, he studied at yeshiva and received Semikhah. He married the daughter of Rabbi Avraham Mordechai Alter, head of the influential Ger hasidic dynasty at the age of 16.

During the World War I, he became involved in helping the victims of the war in Warsaw.

With a support of his family, he became involved in politics; he was one of the leaders of Agudath Israel in Poland, was elected to Warsaw Community Council as a representative of the organisation in 1924, and five years later was elected to the World Agudath Israel presidium. In 1937, he was elected as one of the two co-chairmen of the organisation's executive committee. In 1940, Levin became the sole chairman.

He was also involved in founding the Beis Yaakov school system for religious Jewish girls.

Following the outbreak of World War II, Levin helped refugees in Warsaw, before immigrating to Mandatory Palestine in 1940, where he became head of the local branch of Agudath Israel.

After signing the Israeli declaration of independence in 1948, Levin joined David Ben-Gurion's provisional government as Minister of Welfare. He was elected to the first Knesset in 1949 as a member of the United Religious Front, an alliance of the four major religious parties, and was reappointed to his ministerial role in the first and second governments.

After retaining his seat in the 1951 elections Levin rejoined Ben-Gurion's government as Minister of Welfare, but resigned in 1952 in protest at the National Service Law for Women. He remained a member of the Knesset until his death in 1971, but not a member of the cabinet; in his remaining terms, he represented Religious Torah Front—an alliance of Agudat Yisrael and its worker's branch Poalei Agudat Yisrael.

He was buried on Mount of Olives Jewish Cemetery.

References

External links

1893 births
1971 deaths
Jewish Polish politicians
Leaders of political parties in Israel
Leaders of the Opposition (Israel)
Signatories of the Israeli Declaration of Independence
People from Piaseczno County
United Religious Front politicians
Religious Torah Front politicians
Agudat Yisrael politicians
Members of the 1st Knesset (1949–1951)
Members of the 2nd Knesset (1951–1955)
Members of the 3rd Knesset (1955–1959)
Members of the 4th Knesset (1959–1961)
Members of the 5th Knesset (1961–1965)
Members of the 6th Knesset (1965–1969)
Members of the 7th Knesset (1969–1974)
People from Jerusalem
Councillors in Warsaw
Polish Haredi rabbis
Haredi rabbis in Israel
Rabbinic members of the Knesset
People from Góra Kalwaria
Polish emigrants to Mandatory Palestine